The Failure is a 1915 silent American drama film, directed by Christy Cabanne. It stars John Emerson, Wahnetta Hanson, and A. D. Sears, and was released on May 27, 1915.

Cast list
 John Emerson as Tom Warder
Wahnetta Hanson as Ruth Shipman
Allan Sears as Isaac Shuman
Olga Gray as Rose
 Augustus Carney

References

External links 
 
 
 

Films directed by Christy Cabanne
American silent feature films
American black-and-white films
Silent American drama films
1915 drama films
1915 films
1910s English-language films
1910s American films